Lupinus hyacinthinus is a species of lupine known by the common name San Jacinto lupine. It is native to the mountains of southern California and adjacent Baja California, where it grows in dry areas, often in pine forests. It is a perennial herb growing erect to a maximum height of one meter. It is hairy in texture, its newer herbage gray-green in color. Each palmate leaf is divided into up to 12 narrow leaflets up to 8 centimeters long and a few millimeters wide. The inflorescence bears whorls of flowers each over one centimeter long. The flower is purple or blue with a white to yellow patch on its banner. The fruit is a silky-haired legume pod 3 or 4 centimeters long containing speckled seeds.

References

External links
Jepson Manual Treatment
Photo gallery

hyacinthinus
Flora of California
Flora of Baja California